Four Japanese destroyers have been named :

 JDS Ariake (DD-183), a destroyer of the Japanese Maritime Self-Defense Force (JMSDF), formerly USS Heywood L. Edwards (DD-663)

See also
 Ariake (disambiguation)

Imperial Japanese Navy ship names
Japan Maritime Self-Defense Force ship names
Japanese Navy ship names